Garfield is a locality in Alberta, Canada.

The community was named after James A. Garfield, 20th President of the United States.

References 

Localities in Mountain View County